Chabab Moustaqbal Baladiat de Thénia, known as CMB Thénia or CMBT for short, is an Algerian football club located in Thénia, Algeria. The club was founded in 1910 and its colours are red and white. Their home stadium, Stade de Thénia, has a capacity of 8,000 spectators. The club is currently playing the Ligue Nationale du Football Amateur.

History

The club was founded in 1910 before the independence of Algeria within the town of Thénia (former Ménerville) to practice several sports, including rugby, basketball, and football.

This club was named Sporting Club Ménervillois (SCM) and was known to play football competitions during French colonial times, and both were affiliated with the French Football Federation (FFF) and the League Algiers Football Association (LAFA).

During the 1933–1934 season, the SCM was involved in the Second Division of the Algiers Football League, and during the 1947–48 League Algiers season, the SCM was also part of the teams playing in the Second Division of this league.

After the consecration of this club in the discipline of football on 27 October 1940, it played several competitions during sports seasons until the recovery of national sovereignty.

At Algerian independence in 1962, this club was renamed with the name of Thénia to replace the French Algeria colonial name Ménerville, in order to promote juvenile and school sport.

After the independence of Algeria in 1962, just after Ménerville was renamed Thénia in 1965, the SCM became the Espérance Sportive de Thénia (EST). Some time later in 1972, the EST took the Arabic name of Chabab Moustaqbal Madinate Thénia (CMMT), which means in English "Youth of the future of the city of Thénia". In 1979, the CMMT was renamed Chabab Moustaqbal Baladiyate Thénia (CMBT), which means in English "Youth of the future of the town of Thénia".

Club identity

Colours 
Since the establishment of the club, its colours are the white and the red.

Crest
Historical evolution of the club's crest.

1962–63 Algerian Cup

1962–63 Algerian Championnat National: Group II

1969–70 Algerian Cup

Regional league I

1970–71 season

The ES Thénia team was crowned Regional League I Champion during the 1970–1971 season under the direction of coach Brahim Ramdani.

2001–02 season

The CMBT finished third in the standings after WA Boufarik and ESM Koléa, in the Algerian Third Division Football Championship (D3) for the 2001–2002 season, and was then promoted to the second division (D2 ) for the next season.

2002–03 season

The CMBT ended the 2002–2003 season by being maintained at the level of the League of Regional 1 in Division 3, and this after having played 26 matches of which it won a total of 21 matches.

2003–04 season

At the end of the 2003–2004 season, CMB Thénia was relegated to Regional 1 in Division 4 for the next 2004–2005 season after having won only 5 games during the past season, and losing 21 other games, and could only have recorded 21 points, which earned him the fall with the two teams of ES Ben Aknoun and CRB Tamanrasset.

2004–05 season

The CMBT evolved during the season 2004–2005 at the level of the League of Regional 1 in Division 4.

Regional league II

CMB Thenia secured the title of Ligue Régional II champion for the 2007–2008 season.

2005–06 season

The CMBT evolved during the 2005–2006 season in the Regional II championship where it produced significant sporting performances.

2006–07 season

The CMBT evolved during the 2006–2007 season in the Regional II championship where it produced significant sporting performances.

2007–08 season

The CMBT got off to a good start in the 2007–08 season with a near-perfect run that earned it the Ligue Régional II championship chair he held alone with 14 points, four wins and two draws.

2008–09 season

2009–10 season

Regional league I
In 2010, the CMBT acceded to the Ligue Régional I as representative of the Boumerdès Province teams.

The CMB Thénia club was demoted to the Ligue de Football de la Wilaya in October 2012 after the match where it faced the ES Kouba team.

2010–11 season

2011–12 season

League Boumerdès Football Association

2012–13 season

2010 squad
As of 27 December 2020.

Club presidents

Managers list
  Brahim Ramdani (1969  – 1970)
  Ali Tabet (1970  – 1971)
  Aziz Ferhat (1999  – 2001)
  Ahmed Aït El Hocine (2001  – 2003)
  Amar Medjerab (2003  – 2005)
  Malik Ferhat (2005  – 2007)
  Aziz Ferhat (2007  – 2009)
  Karim Kaced (2009  – 2010)
  Malik Ferhat (2010  – 2011)
  Rabah Talamali (2011  – 2012)
  Malik Ferhat (2012  – 2016)
  Abdelghani Deraï (2016  – 2018)
  Mohamed Amine Boushaki (2018  – 2021)

Notable former players
  Amine Boushaki, judoka

See also
League Boumerdès Football Association

References

External links

CMB Thénia
Football clubs in Algeria
Sports clubs in Algeria
Association football clubs established in 1910
1910 establishments in Algeria